Route 206-CH is a branch line road going northwest from Chile Highway 5 at Paillaco. The route is paved and connects the city of Valdivia with the town of Paillaco. Near Valdivia the road runs across wetlands formed by subsidence during the 1960 Valdivia earthquake.

References

Roads in Chile
Transport in Los Ríos Region